Quality of Life Research is a peer-reviewed academic journal covering research into quality of life from a medical and public health perspective. It was established in 1992 and is published ten times per year by Springer Science+Business Media. It is the official journal of the International Society of Quality of Life Research. The editors-in-chief are Jan Böhnke (University of Dundee) and Claudia Rutherford (University of Sydney). According to the Journal Citation Reports, the journal has a 2017 impact factor of 2.392.

References

External links

General medical journals
Public health journals
Springer Science+Business Media academic journals
Publications established in 1992
English-language journals
Academic journals associated with international learned and professional societies
10 times per year journals